Follett may refer to:

Places
 County of Follett, Australia
 Electoral district of Normanby, Dundas and Follett, one of the 16 original electoral districts of Victoria
 Follett, Texas
 Follett High School, in Follett, Texas
 Follett Independent School District, in Follett, Texas
 Follett Stone Arch Bridge Historic District, in Vermont
 Folletts, Iowa

Corporations
 Follett Corporation, a company that provides educational products to schools, colleges, and libraries
 Follett Ice, a company that manufactures ice and beverage equipment, and refrigerators and freezers

People
 A. Follett Osler (1808–1903), British meteorologist
 Barbara Follett (politician) (born 1942), English politician
 Barbara Newhall Follett (1914–1939), American novelist
 Brent Follett (1810–1887), British politician
 Brian Follett (born 1939), British government official
 Burley Follett (1806–1877), mayor of Green Bay, Wisconsin
 David Follett (1907–1982), director of the London Science Museum
 David Follett (cricketer) (born 1968), English cricketer
 Follett Johnson (1843–1909), American soldier and Medal of Honor recipient
 Follett Thomas (1863–1942), Australian politician
 Frederick Follett (1804–1891), American newspaper editor and politician
 James Follett (1939–2021), English author/screenwriter
 John F. Follett (1831–1902), American politician
 Joseph L. Follett (1843–1907), American soldier and Medal of Honor recipient
 Ken Follett (born 1949), Welsh novelist
 King Follett (1788–1844), an early Mormon elder
 Martin Dewey Follett (1826–1911), American politician
 Mary Parker Follett (1868–1933), American management and political theorist
 Rosemary Follett (born 1948), Australian politician
 William Webb Follett (1796–1845), English politician
 Wilson Follett (1887–1963), author of Modern American Usage
 Zack Follett (born 1987), American football player

See also 
 Follett House, a historic house in Vermont
 Follett v. Town of McCormick, an American Supreme Court decision
 King Follett discourse, an address delivered by LDS founder Joseph Smith